Mary Davis may refer to:
Moll Davis (Mary Davis, c. 1648–1708), actress and mistress of Charles II of Great Britain
Mary E. P. Davis (1840–1924), American nursing instructor
Mary Davis (artist) (1866–1941), English artist
Mary Davis (actress) (1870–1944), American silent film actress
Mary Gould Davis (1882–1956), American author, librarian, storyteller and editor
Mary Lund Davis (1922–2008), modernist architect
Mary Davis (activist) (born 1954), Special Olympics organiser and candidate in the Irish presidential election, 2011
Mary Bond Davis (born 1958), American singer, actor and dancer
Mary Davis, singer of the S.O.S. Band

See also
Mary Davies (disambiguation)